The 2009 Indian general election polls in Tamil Nadu was held for 39 seats in the state. There was a radical change in the alliances in this election compared to the last election, reminiscent of the 1999 election in Tamil Nadu. In this election the Dravida Munnetra Kazhagam (DMK) decided to stay with the United Progressive Alliance (UPA), but the Pattali Makkal Katchi (PMK), Marumalarchi Dravida Munnetra Kazhagam (MDMK (breakaway)), and the left parties decided to ally itself with the All India Anna Dravida Munnetra Kazhagam (AIADMK) and the newly formed Third Front named United National Progressive Alliance.

After counting on 16 May 2009, the results to everyone surprise, showed the DMK and its allies, Indian National Congress and Viduthalai Chiruthaigal Katchi, winning in a landslide victory, securing 27 out of 39 seats. DMK and its allies were also able to hold on to Pondicherry, which has one seat.  Many expected, before the election, through opinion polling and voters on the ground, that AIADMK, and its allies, who were formerly with the UPA (PMK, MDMK, Left Front) in 2004, would win in a landslide, but due to the late surge of support for the DMK, and the nationwide support of the UPA government, the DMK and its allies, ended up winning the most seats, and this victory, proved crucial, for Congress to form the government on its own, without the Left Front.

M.K. Azhagiri, son of DMK leader Karunanidhi, ran in the Madurai, and won his debut run in national politics. Out of the 24 incumbents from the 2004 Election, who ran again in this election, only 10 incumbents won, with 7 of the members from the DMK and 3 of the members from the Indian National Congress (INC).

Even though it was a big victory for DMK and allies, Congress fared poorly in the state compared to DMK, where cabinet minister Mani Shankar Aiyar, who has been in power in Mayiladuturai constituency for 10 years, was defeated and P. Chidambaram, who has been in power in Sivaganga constituency, for past 25 years, lost according to the first counting, and won during the recount, barely winning his constituency.

Even though the opposition party failed to get more seats than the DMK and its allies, AIADMK, improved its tally to 9 seats, from winning no seats in 2004. But the opposition allies (PMK, MDMK and Left Parties), significantly lost seats compared to the 2004 election, when they allied with DMK. PMK especially lost all 6 of its seats that it got in the last Lok Sabha, coming out as the biggest loser of this election in Tamil Nadu.

Seat allotments

United Progressive Alliance

Third Front

Voting and results

Results by Pre-Poll Alliance

|-
! style="background-color:#E9E9E9" colspan=2 |Alliance/Party
! style="background-color:#E9E9E9;text-align:right;" |Seats won
! style="background-color:#E9E9E9;text-align:right;" |Change†
! style="background-color:#E9E9E9;text-align:right;" |Popular Vote
! style="background-color:#E9E9E9;text-align:right;" |Vote %
! style="background-color:#E9E9E9;text-align:right;" |Adj. %‡
|-
! colspan=2 style="text-align:center;vertical-align:middle;background-color:#009900; color:white"|UPA
| 27
| +1
| 12,929,043
| colspan=2 style="text-align:center;vertical-align:middle;"| 42.5%
|-
|DMK
! style="background-color: #FF0000" |
| 18
| +2
| 7,625,397
| 25.1%
| 44.9%
|-
|INC
! style="background-color: #00FFFF" |
| 8
| -2
| 4,567,799
| 15.0%
| 38.9%
|-
|VCK
! style="background-color: #FFFF00" |
| 1
| +1
| 735,847
| 2.4%
| 44.2%
|-
! colspan=2 style="text-align:center;vertical-align:middle;background-color:#FF0000; color:white"|TF
| 12
| -1
| 11,544,419
| colspan=2 style="text-align:center;vertical-align:middle;"| 38.0%
|-
|AIADMK
! style="background-color: #008000" |
| 9
| +9
| 6,953,591
| 22.9%
| 39.1%
|-
|MDMK
! style="background-color: #FF00FF" |
| 1
| -3
| 1,112,908
| 3.7%
| 36.5%
|-
|CPI
! style="background-color: #0000FF" |
| 1
| -1
| 864,572
| 2.8%
| 39.9%
|-
|CPI(M)
! style="background-color: #000080" |
| 1
| -1
| 668,729
| 2.2%
| 28.1%
|-
|PMK
! style="background-color: " |
| 0
| -5
| 1,944,619
| 6.4%
| 39.0%
|-
! colspan=2 style="text-align:center;vertical-align:middle;background-color:gray; color:white"|Others
| 0
| –
| 6,135,920
| colspan=2 style="text-align:center;vertical-align:middle;"| 20.2%
|-
|DMDK
! style="background-color: " |
| 0
| –
| 3,126,117
| 10.3%
| 10.3%
|-
|BJP
! style="background-color: " |
| 0
| –
| 711,790
| 2.3%
| 5.3%
|-
|IND
! style="background-color: " |
| 0
| –
| 
| 
| 
|-
| style="text-align:center;" |Total
! style="background-color: " |
| 39
| –
| 30,390,998
| 100%
| style="text-align:center;" | –
|-
|}
†: Seat change represents seats won in terms of the current alliances, which is considerably different from the last election.‡: Vote % reflects the percentage of votes the party received compared to the entire electorate that voted in this election. Adjusted (Adj.) Vote %, reflects the % of votes the party received per constituency that they contested.
Sources: Election Commission of India

List of elected MPs
Source: Election Commission of India
24 Incumbents (7 (DMK), 8 (INC), 5 (PMK), 1 (MDMK), 1 (CPM) from the 2004 Lok Sabha election ran in this election, either for the same constituency, or a different constituency. Since the UPA and the Left Front swept the last election, all of the incumbents were either from UPA or Left Front. 15 of them are now currently running for the UPA, while the other 7 candidates, from PMK, MDMK and CPM, are running for the Third Front.

* – represents incumbents in previous Lok Sabha (2004–2009) from Tamil Nadu.
a – Defeated candidate and party represents candidate and party that got the second most votes.

Post-election Union Council of Ministers from Tamil Nadu

Cabinet Ministers

Ministers of State

[1] – Due to his involvement with the 2G spectrum allocation case, A. Raja resigned as cabinet minister and MP on 14 November 2010. (See Spectrum Scandal)
[2] – Resigned on 7 July 2011 due to the CBI investigation on his involvement as Telecom minister in 2006.
[3] – Resigned on 20 March 2013 as party withdraw from the government.

See also 
 Elections in Tamil Nadu

References

External links
 Official Website of Election Commission of India
 Election statistics provided by ECI

T
Indian general elections in Tamil Nadu
2000s in Tamil Nadu